Mosteiros Airport  was a public use airfield near Mosteiros, in the northeastern part of the island Fogo, Cape Verde. The airfield operated at least since 1957 when Aero Clube de Cabo Verde opened a new air route to MTI/GVMT, with a Dove airplane which could transport 9 passengers. The airfield was closed at the end of the 1990s. Since then, the only airfield of Fogo is São Filipe Airport. Mosteiros Airport was located at the northwestern edge of the city of Mosteiros.

See also
List of airports in Cape Verde
List of buildings and structures in Cape Verde

References 

Airports in Cape Verde
Mosteiros, Cape Verde
Defunct airports